BH Veza is a Bosnian television network founded in 2016.

With a syndicated broadcasting programme under the BH Veza label, cantonal public TV stations have managed to cover a significant part of the territory of Federation of Bosnia and Herzegovina.

Broadcasters and the founders of the joint program BH Veza are five public television stations in the major Bosnian cities: 
 TVSA from Sarajevo 
 RTV TK from Tuzla
 RTV ZE from Zenica 
 RTV USK from Bihać 
 RTV Goražde from Goražde 
 City TV from Mostar* 

BH Veza broadcast programs that are jointly purchased, produced or co-produced by all member TV stations. The news program and a variety TV shows broadcast simultaneously on all six TV stations. On weekends, television stations jointly produce a morning or afternoon program for the network.

Public Broadcasting Service of the Federation of Bosnia and Herzegovina entity, RTV FBiH is not part of this project.

See also
 Mreža TV
 Program Plus
 Television in Bosnia and Herzegovina

References

External links
Official website of RTV TK 
Official website of RTV USK 
Official website of TVSA 
Official website of RTV TK 
Official website of CITY TV 

Television stations in Bosnia and Herzegovina
Television channels and stations established in 2016
2016 establishments in Bosnia and Herzegovina